The Blackfoot Mountains, also called the Blackfoot Range, is a small range of mountains located east of Blackfoot, Idaho. Most of the area is private property, including the range's tallest mountain, Taylor Mountain. This mountain was named after Sam Taylor, an early settler and brother of Matt Taylor. The Blackfoot River carves through the region. Within this range is Wolverine Canyon, a public area that features sites for hiking, camping, kayaking, rock climbing and other recreational pursuits.

Ecology 
This area is mainly a hilly shrub-steppe, covered in sagebrush and juniper.  However, there are many springs and small streams which form microclimates with more water-loving plants. The mountains themselves are mainly basalt.

References 

Landforms of Bingham County, Idaho
Mountain ranges of Idaho